Guilin Laurent Bizanet (10 August 175518 April 1836) was a Republican French Revolutionary General who served during the American Revolutionary War, French Revolutionary Wars and the Napoleonic Wars.

Life
Born in Grenoble, capital of the French department of Isère, Bizanet began his career as a sailor-gunner on 4November 1780 and was aboard the Majestueux during the American Revolutionary War from 11June 1781 to 24January 1783.
After volunteering for the army, he became a brigadier-general on 22August 1793 and a divisional general on 10April 1794. He was a defender at Monaco in 1793 and at the end of the French Consulate in 1804 became the commander of the armies in Marseille.

He was named commandant at the fortress of Bergen op Zoom in 1810 and successfully repelled a night attack on 8March 1814 led by General Sir Thomas Graham. After the attack, Graham wrote in a despatch to London:"Sir ... I am anxious too to do justice to the conduct of General Bizanet, which, truly characteristic of a brave mun, has been
marked from the first with the most kind and humane attentions to the prisoners."

Bizanet was commander of Marseille during the Hundred Days under Marshal Guillaume Brune.

Awards
He was made a Knight of the Legion of Honour on 12December 1803 then an Officer of the same order on 14June 1804. On 19July 1814 he was made a Knight of the Order of Saint Louis by Louis XVIII of France.
His name is engraved on the 40th Column of the Arc de Triomph

References

1755 births
1836 deaths
Chevaliers of the Légion d'honneur
French military personnel of the French Revolutionary Wars
Order of Saint Louis recipients
French commanders of the Napoleonic Wars
French military personnel of the American Revolutionary War
Names inscribed under the Arc de Triomphe